Louis-François L'Héritier, also known under the name L'Héritier de l'Ain (30 May 1788 – 14 July 1852) was a 19th-century French playwright, essayist, novelist and journalist.

He collaborated on various liberal newspapers and wrote several novels with Henri Ducor. He also realized translations such as Histoire des révolutions des Pays-Bas by Friedrich von Schiller (1833) or Les Veillées allemandes, chroniques, contes, traditions et croyances populaires by Jacob Grimm and Wilhelm Grimm (1838).

Works 

1811: Description d'un instrument servant à faciliter le tracé des tranchées dans l'attaque des places
1813: Épître à Chénier
1814: Le Diable boiteux à Paris, one-act comédie épisodique, mingled with couplets
1818: Les Veillées d'une captive, with Antony Béraud and Auguste Imbert
1819: Lettres à David, sur le Salon de 1819, with Émile Deschamps and Henri de Latouche, engraving by Ambroise Tardieu
1819: Le Champ-d'Asile, topographical and historical picture of Texas
1818–1822: Les Fastes de la gloire ou les Braves recommandés à la postérité, monument élevé aux défenseurs de la Patrie, par une Société d'hommes de lettres et de militaires, 5 vols.
1821: Précis, ou Histoire abrégée des guerres de la Révolution française, depuis 1792 jusqu'à 1815, avec Pierre-François Tissot
1822: Dernières Lettres de deux amants de Barcelone, with Henri de Latouche
1828: Le Convoi de Louis XIV, scène historique inédite
1828–1829 Mémoires de Vidocq, chef de la police de sûreté jusqu'en 1827, aujourd'hui propriétaire et fabricant de papiers à Saint-Mandé, 4 vols.
1828–1830: Mémoires et souvenirs d'un Pair de France, 4 vols.
1829: Les Malheurs d'une libérée.
1829: Mémoires pour servir à l'histoire de la Révolution française, par Sanson, exécuteur des arrêts criminels pendant la Révolution, with Honoré de Balzac
1835: Aventures d'un marin de la Garde impériale, prisonnier de guerre sur les pontons espagnols, dans l'île de Cabrèra et en Russie, novel, with Ducor
1833: La République, histoire de la famille Clairvent, 2 vols.
1835: Le Prêche et la Messe, roman chronique des guerres de religion pendant le XVI, 2 vols.
1838: Le roi règne et peut gouverner
1841: De la Constitution de la Chambre des Pairs
1841–1843: Plutarque drôlatique, vie publique et grotesque des illustres de ce temps-ci
1844: Le Médecin de soi-même, moyen sûr et peu coûteux de se préserver et de se guérir de toutes les maladies
1845: Le Pharmacien de soi-même, complément indispensable du « Médecin de soi-même » et correctif nécessaire de la médication de M. Raspail, contenant plus de 750 recettes ou formules... ou Petite Pharmacopée populaire à l'usage des villes et villages et des praticiens de campagne
1868: Les Mystères de la vie du monde, du demi-monde et du quart de monde, ou La vie d'aujourd'hui, novel

Bibliography 
 Joseph-Marie Quérard, Les Supercheries littéraires dévoilées, vol.5, 1853,  (read online) 
 Antoine-Alexandre Barbier, Olivier Alexandre Barbier, Paul Billiard, Dictionnaire des ouvrages anonymes, 1874, 
 Gustave Vapereau, Dictionnaire universel des littératures, vol.2, 1876
 Roger Pierrot, Correspondance d'Honoré de Balzac, 1960,

References 

19th-century French dramatists and playwrights
19th-century French journalists
French male journalists
19th-century French novelists
Honoré de Balzac
1788 births
Writers from Bourg-en-Bresse
1852 deaths